Vintage TV may refer to:

Vintage TV (Canada), a Canadian music television channel
Vintage TV (TV channel), a music television channel which was available in the UK, Canada and Ireland
Vintage Television, a Philippine sports-oriented media company
In2TV, a US television channel which has a 'TV Category' called Vintage TV